T&T Clark is a British publishing firm which was founded in Edinburgh, Scotland, in 1821 and which now exists as an imprint of Bloomsbury Publishing.

History
The firm was founded in 1821 by Thomas Clark, then aged 22 and who had a Free Church of Scotland background. The company was originally concerned with law and foreign literature and published under the name of "Thomas Clark".

He was joined in a partnership in 1846 by his nephew, also named Thomas Clark. With the arrival of younger Thomas Clark (1823-1900) the firm began issuing works under the name of "T. & T. Clark".

In the 1830s, it began to develop a theology list, taking a progressive evangelical stance and at times, publishing books that were not likely to make a profit. It published work by scholars in both Europe and North America. Its most substantial projects were the English translation of the Ante-Nicene Fathers (which the firm titled Ante-Nicene Christian Library) and the Encyclopaedia of Religion and Ethics. These were only viable because of the existence of a large American market; however, in the 1880s the firm got into a dispute with the Fleming H. Revell Company, over the American firm's copyright violation of some of T&T Clark's titles. The Ante-Nicene Library was bootlegged by the Christian Literature Publishing Company, based in New York City, New York. However, this did not prevent T&T Clark from doing business with them.

In 1965, the company began to publish Concilium, an academic journal of Roman Catholic theology. 

In 2003, the three religious academic imprints of Sheffield Academic Press, Trinity Press International and T&T Clark were all acquired by the Continuum International Publishing Group, which itself was acquired by Bloomsbury Publishing in 2011.

Reference works
Each of the following four works was edited by James Hastings
 Dictionary of the Bible, (1898–1904), 5 vols.
 Encyclopaedia of Religion and Ethics, (1908–1926; 2nd edition 1925–1940, reprint 1955), 13 vols.
 The Great Texts of the Bible, (1910–1915), 20 vols.
 The Greater Men and Women of the Bible, (1913–1916), 6 vols.

Book series

See also
 Culture of London
 Literature of England
 Literature of Scotland

References

Further reading

 Dempster, John A. H., The profitability of progressive theology publishing in late nineteenth-century Scotland as illustrated by the experience of T. & T. Clark of Edinburgh in the 1880s and 1890s, Ph.D. thesis, University of Strathclyde, 1987. Direct download link here.
 Dempster, John A. H., The T. & T. Clark Story – A Victorian Publisher and the New Theology – With an Epilogue Covering the Twentieth-Century History of the Firm, Edinburgh: Pentland Press, 1992.

External links
  , official website of Continuum Books Now links to Bloomsbury.com the official website of Bloomsbury Publishing.

1821 establishments in Scotland
Academic publishing companies
Book publishing companies based in London
Book publishing companies of Scotland
Book publishing company imprints
Christian publishing companies
Companies based in Edinburgh
Publishing companies established in 1821
British companies established in 1821